British Comedy Guide or BCG (formerly the British Sitcom Guide or BSG) is a British website covering all forms of British comedy, across all media. At the time of writing, BCG has published guides to more than 7,000 individual British comedies - primarily TV and radio situation comedy, sketch shows, comedy dramas, satire, variety and panel games. Other notable features on BCG include a news section, a message board,  interviews with comedians and actors, a series of comment and opinion articles, a searchable merchandise database, and a section offering advice to aspiring comedy writers. The website also runs The Comedy.co.uk Awards and hosts several podcast series, some of which have won awards.

Reportedly, British Comedy Guide attracts over 500,000 unique visitors a month, making it Britain's most-visited comedy-related reference website.

Background

The website was founded in August 2003 as the British Sitcom Guide (BSG), a website devoted to British sitcom TV programmes. The website was established by Mark Boosey, a freelance web developer, originally as a hobby. However, in 2008, it was decided to expand the remit of the website to cover all forms of British comedy, and thus the BSG was re-launched as British Comedy Guide or BCG, and has continued to expand since this point.

Other features added since the site's re-launch in 2008 as British Comedy Guide include a series of podcasts, a section featuring interviews with people working in the British comedy industry and a Twitter-based news service.

The website went through another relaunch in 2016, where it underwent a re-design of the layout, a new logo, and increased coverage of online comedy and people working in British comedy.

In 2015, BCG's data specialist Ian Wolf was awarded the inaugural "Unsung Hero" at the first FringePig Ham Fist awards for his work collating reviews during that year's Edinburgh Festival Fringe.

Key people

Podcasts
BCG hosts a range of podcasts, some of which have gone on to win awards. As It Occurs To Me was nominated for a Sony Radio Academy Award in 2010, Do The Right Thing won the Bronze Sony Award for "Best Internet Programme" in 2012, Pappy's Flatshare Slamdown won the 2012 Loaded Lafta award for "Best Podcast", and Richard Herring's Leicester Square Theatre Podcast won the Bronze Sony Radio Award for comedy in 2013.

In June 2013, an episode of Richard Herring's Leicester Square Theatre Podcast saw host Richard Herring interviewing Stephen Fry, in which Fry revealed that he had attempted to commit suicide. The story was also reported widely across the media, including the BBC and Sky News.

The podcasts hosted by BCG are:

The Comedy.co.uk Awards
In January 2007, the website launched The British Sitcom Guide Awards, which were later renamed The British Comedy Guide Awards and are now known as The Comedy.co.uk Awards. The awards are notable for allowing the public to choose the winners via an online poll, but with no shortlist - all broadcast programmes are available to choose. This differs from the British Comedy Awards which relies on broadcasters to put their programmes forward for nomination, and only uses a small panel of judges to determine the results. Additionally, The Comedy.co.uk Awards seeks to name not just the winners, but the worst programme in each category too.

In order to be considered for a Comedy.co.uk Award, a programme must be a British comedy which has had at least one new episode broadcast on British TV or radio between 1 January and 31 December of the previous year. The only exception is shows which span across the new year, in which case it is nominated only in the first of the years.

Up until the 2015 awards the visitors taking part in the poll are asked to give three votes in each category: one to their favourite show, one to their second favourite show, and one to their least favourite show. The vote for "top favourite" scores two points for the selected programme, and a vote for a "second favourite" scores one. The comedy programme with the most points is declared the winner in that category. The show which receives the highest number of "worst" votes is declared the worst comedy in that category. The 2016 awards change format, removing the "worst" categories, and people voting for the top three programmes, with their favourite show scoring three points, their second favourite two points, and their third favourite one point. In the first week of voting all comedies from the year could be voted on, in the second week the six most popular shows in every category formed a shortlist.

All of the awards are voted for by the website's users except one, the British Comedy Guide Editors' Award, which is an award voted for just by the controllers of the guide, and is given "to the show, person, channel, or indeed anything else comedy related that deserves some recognition."

2006
The first awards were presented in January 2007 and were known at the time as The British Sitcom Guide Awards 2006, but have since been renamed. Below are the awards.

2007
The second awards were presented in January 2008, originally under the title The British Sitcom Guide Awards 2007. Below are the results.

2008
The third awards were presented in January 2009 and were the first to include radio shows. The 2008 awards were known as the British Comedy Guide Awards 2008, but were renamed in 2009 to reflect the website's new URL. Below are the awards.

2009
The fourth awards were presented in January 2010. Below are the results.

2010
The fifth awards were presented in January 2011. Below are the results.

2011
The sixth awards were presented on 23 January 2012. Below are the results.

2012
The seventh awards were presented on 21 January 2013. Below are the results.

2013

The eighth awards were presented on 20 January 2014. Below are the results.

2014

The ninth awards were presented on 26 January 2015. Below are the results.

2015

The tenth awards were presented on 1 February 2016. Below are the results.

2016
The 11th awards will be presented on 23 January 2016. Below are the nominations and winners.

2017
The 12th awards were presented on 29 January 2017. Below are the nominations and winners.

2018
The 13th awards were presented on 4 February 2019. Below are the nominations and winners.

2019
The 14th awards were presented on 27 January 2020. Below are the nominations and winners.

2020
The 15th awards were presented on 8 February 2021. Below are the nominations and winners.

Footnotes

References

External links
 

British comedy websites
Internet properties established in 2003